Kathleen Daphne Skillern QPM (29 November 1927 – 20 October 2012) was a British police officer. She was the second woman to hold the rank of commander in the London Metropolitan Police (after Shirley Becke) and the first woman to head a branch at Scotland Yard apart from A4 (Women Police), which was disbanded in 1973; in 1974 she took command of CO (Commissioner's Office) Branch, responsible for research and personnel.

Skillern spent most of her career as a detective in the Criminal Investigation Department. She was promoted to commander on 29 April 1974. In August 1977 she was transferred to head the C1 Department of CID, which included the Obscene Publications Squad, the first woman to head this department. She was awarded the Queen's Police Medal (QPM) in the 1979 Birthday Honours and retired in 1980.

Footnotes

References
Obituary, The Telegraph, 7 November 2012

2012 deaths
1927 births
People from Cinderford
Metropolitan Police chief officers
Women Metropolitan Police officers
English recipients of the Queen's Police Medal
Metropolitan Police recipients of the Queen's Police Medal
Year of birth uncertain